Professor Kageyama's Maths Training: The Hundred Cell Calculation Method is a puzzle video game published by Nintendo and developed by Jupiter for the Nintendo DS handheld video game console. It was first released in Japan, then later in Europe and Australasia. It was released in North America as Personal Trainer: Math on January 12, 2009 and also in South Korea in 2009. The game is part of both the Touch! Generations and Personal Trainer series. The game received mixed reviews, with common criticisms cited for the game's difficulty in recognizing some numbers and for not being very entertaining to play. At GameRankings, it holds an average review score of 65%.

Gameplay
Maths Training, designed to be played daily, uses a method called "The Hundred Cell Calculation Method" that focuses on repetition of basic arithmetic. This method was developed by Professor Kageyama who works at the Centre for Research and Educational Development at Ritsumeikan University, Kyoto. Utilizing a 10 x 10 grid of blank squares lined with rows of numbers along the top and side of the grid, the player has to match up each top number with each side number and add or subtract or multiply them. They then fill in the appropriate square with the appropriate answer.

The game is played by holding the Nintendo DS vertically like a book, and it supports both right- and left-handed users, allowing them to view the exercises on the message screen while they note down their answers with the stylus on the Touch Screen. The user can play against up to 15 other Nintendo DS users by using the DS Download Play option or with multiple game cards.

See also 
List of Nintendo DS games
Personal Trainer: Cooking
Personal Trainer: Walking

Notes

References

External links
Official website for Japan

2007 video games
Brain training video games
Mathematical education video games
Jupiter (company) games
Nintendo DS games
Nintendo DS-only games
Nintendo games
Shogakukan
Touch! Generations
Video games developed in Japan
Multiplayer and single-player video games